Globe Award is an international sustainability award which aims at encouraging and promoting individual scientists as well as groups of innovators in the corporate and public sector that have excelled in sustainable development in the world. Globe Award is a not-for-profit organization which focuses on fostering sustainability within societies. Globe Award’s main goal is to inspire actors to take responsibility and act globally through awarding great causes within research, innovations, municipalities and companies.

The award is handed out in 4 categories: Sustainability Research, Sustainability Innovation, Sustainable City and Sustainability Reporting.

Globe Award values

1. Sustainable development

Driving sustainability by recognizing and awarding sustainability champions from around the world is crucial. This is about understanding the consequences of today's activities and believing in global collaboration to reach solutions which will safeguard humanity’s welfare today and in the future.

2. Impact

It is important to create behavioral change through rewarding unique solutions that can be implemented in order to make a change.

3. Transparency

The Globe Award jury groups run the selection process equally and independently.

4. Innovation

Honoring tomorrow's leaders that are developing innovative solutions to the world’s sustainability challenges. Innovative business perspectives are considered as well as people, planet and profit.

The four noted and internationally recognized jury groups consist of experts in sustainability from all over the world. They select one winner in each category independently and on objective grounds. There is one overall jury chairman who, along with the Globe Award secretariat, ensures that the process and selection of applications is obeyed.
Globe Award is an initiative by Globe Forum.

History

When first started in 2007, Globe Award was a Swedish CSR Award. After two years of success in Sweden, Globe Forum decided to go further with Globe Award. Struggling to make a difference by  increasing awareness towards sustainable development in all societies, it made sense to create Globe Award as a truly global prize focusing on sustainability, instead of CSR, starting from 2009.
The award ceremony takes place annually in Stockholm. The initiative is supported by H.R.H. Victoria, Crown Princess of Sweden.
In addition to the global prize, there was a national prize in Poland in Gdansk in 2009. The Globe Award Polish Edition was handed out in two categories: Sustainability Innovation and Sustainable City.

Former winners

2007

 Best CSR Research – Sustainability Research Group of the Stockholm School of Economics, Sweden
 Best CSR Entrepreneur – Scandinavian Biogas, Sweden
 Best CSR Company – SKF, Sweden

2008

 Best CSR Research – Sustainable Investment Research Platform, SIRP, at Umeå School of Business, Sweden
 Best CSR Entrepreneur – Rehact AB, Sweden. An honorary diploma was given to Umbilical Design AB.
 Best Integration of CSR in Business Operations – Electrolux, Sweden

2009

 Sustainability Research – Nimbkar Agricultural Research Institute (NARI),India
 Sustainability Innovation – Tesla Motors, USA
 Sustainable City – Cardiff, UK
 Sustainability Reporting – Novo Nordisk, Denmark

2010

 Sustainability Research – Antrix Corporation ISRO, India
 Sustainable City – Curitiba, Brazil
 Sustainability Reporting – CLP, Hong Kong

Globe Award, together with World Bank, has been building an independent, global foundation which will annually award outstanding sustainable cases in the world.

References

External links
 
 
 

Awards established in 2007
International sustainable development
Science and technology awards
Swedish awards